The Memorial to Ippolito Merenda is a funerary monument designed by the Italian artist Gian Lorenzo Bernini between 1636 and 1638. Along with the similar monument for Alessandro Valtrini, this artwork was a startling new approach to funerary monuments, incorporating dynamic, flowing inscriptions being dragged by a moving figure of death. It is in the church of San Giacomo alla Lungara in Rome.

Merenda was from Cesena in Emilia Romagna. He left a bequest to San Giacomo della Lungara (of 20,000 Roman scudi) on his death in 1636. One of the nephews of the then pope Urban VIII, Cardinal Francesco Barberini, then commissioned the monument from Bernini in recognition of Merenda's contribution.

See also
List of works by Gian Lorenzo Bernini

Notes

References
 
 

Monuments and memorials in Rome
Sculptures by Gian Lorenzo Bernini
1640s sculptures
Marble sculptures in Italy